The 2010 Dublin Senior Football Championship is the inter club Gaelic football competition between the top teams in Dublin GAA. The first round draw was announced on 10 March 2010.

First round
The winners of the first round progressed to the second round, the losers went on to a backdoor round with a chance to progress to the second round.

Raheny received a bye to the next round.

Backdoor Round
This round is the first knockout round between the losers of the first round of the 2010 Dublin Championship, the losers will enter the relegation round and the winners go on to qualify for the third round against the losers of the second round ties. Thomas Davis, Ballymun Kickham's, Fingallian's, Round Towers (C), Trinity Gaels and Fingal Ravens progressed to the third round of the competition. St. Mark's, Erin's Isle, Clontarf, Naomh Mearnóg, Parnell's and St. Patrick's, Palmerstown went on to contest the relegation championship, with the eventual losers playing in the Dublin Intermediate Football Championship in 2011.

Second round
The winners of the second round went on to qualify for the fourth round of the Championship. The losers played in the third round against the winners of the backdoor round. St. Vincent's, Lucan Sarsfields, UCD, St. Oliver Plunkett's Eoghan Ruadh, Na Fianna, St. Brigid's, Kilmacud Crokes and 2009 champions Ballyboden St. Enda's went to the fourth round. Raheny, O'Toole's, Templeogue SS, St. Sylvester's, Ballinteer St. John's, St. Anne's, St. Maur's and last year's finalists St. Jude got a second chance to progress in the third round of the competition.

Third round
In the third round, the backdoor winners are paired against the losers of the second round. The winners of the third round qualify for the fourth round against the second round winners. Thomas Davis, St Annes, Raheny, Trinity Gaels, St. Maur's, Ballinteer St Johns, Templeogue SS and Round Towers, Clondalkin were eliminated from the championship during this round, their next game will be in the 2011 Dublin championship. St Judes, St Peregrines, Ballymun Kickhams, O'Tooles, Fingallians, Round Towers Clondalkin, Fingal Ravens and St Marys, Saggart have qualified for the fourth round of the 2010 Dublin Championship.

Fourth round
The winners of the fourth round progress to the quarter finals of the Dublin Championship. The losers are eliminated from the competition. St Judes, O'Tooles, St Sylvesters, Ballymun Kickhams, St Peregrines, Raheny, Fingal Ravens and St Marys, Saggart were eliminated from the competition at the fourth round stage. St Brigids, Na Fianna, Kilmacud Crokes, St Vincents, UCD, Ballyboden St Endas, Lucan Sarsfields and St Oliver Plunketts Eoghan Ruadh all qualified for the semi final of the championship.

Quarter finals
St Brigids, Kilmacud Crokes, St Vincents and St Oliver Plunketts Eoghan Ruadh progressed to the semi finals of the Dublin Championship. The UCD, Lucan Sarsfields, Na Fianna and lastyear's champions Ballyboden St Endas were eliminated from the competition.

Semi finals
St Oliver Plunketts Eoghan Ruadh, Kilmacud Crokes, St Brigids and St Vincents are the teams participating in the last four of the Dublin championship.

Dublin Senior Football Final

Relegation
These games are the opposite of a knock out competition, with the winners of each game leaving the competition as they win. Naomh Mearnóg, Erins Isle and St Marks are safe from relegation for 2010. In the end, all relegation games were obsolete, as the Intermediate championship winners St Brigids already had a Senior team.

References

Dublin Senior Football Championship
Dublin Senior Football Championship